Lyrestad is a locality situated in Mariestad Municipality, Västra Götaland County, Sweden. It had 479 inhabitants in 2010. In Lyrestad the Kinnekullebanan railway crosses the Göta Canal.

References 

Populated places in Västra Götaland County
Populated places in Mariestad Municipality